is a professional race car driver.

Complete Formula Nippon results 
(key) (Races in bold indicate pole position) (Races in italics indicate fastest lap)

References 

1967 births
Living people
Japanese racing drivers
Formula Nippon drivers
Super GT drivers